Apateodus (meaning "confusing tooth") is a genus of prehistoric ray-finned fish which was described by Woodward in 1901. The genus spans from the Albian to the late Maastrichtian, and specimens have been found in Russia, India, the United States (Colorado, Dakota, Kansas), and the Netherlands.

Description
Known by well preserved skull remains, Apateodus is estimated to be around 1 meter (3.3ft) in length, and would have been an effective mesopredator.

References

http://paleodb.org/cgi-bin/bridge.pl?action=checkTaxonInfo&taxon_no=35555&is_real_user=1

Prehistoric aulopiformes
Prehistoric ray-finned fish genera
Extinct animals of India
Extinct animals of Russia
Cretaceous bony fish
Fossil taxa described in 1901
Late Cretaceous fish of Asia